Nascent state is a psychological process of destructuration-reorganization.

Nascent state may also refer to:

 Nascent state (chemistry), a superseded chemical theory
 In statu nascendi, a Latin phrase